Ujitoshi Konomi (December 16, 1912 – March 5, 1980) was a Japanese sport shooter who competed in the 1956 Summer Olympics.

Hip hop artist UZI is Konomi's grandson.

References

1912 births
1980 deaths
Japanese male sport shooters
Trap and double trap shooters
Olympic shooters of Japan
Shooters at the 1956 Summer Olympics
Shooters at the 1958 Asian Games
Asian Games medalists in shooting
Asian Games gold medalists for Japan
Medalists at the 1958 Asian Games
20th-century Japanese people